was a Japanese girl group in Hello! Project, formerly made up of leader and Morning Musume member Reina Tanaka, Miyabi Natsuyaki and Airi Suzuki, two Hello! Project Kids.

History
The group's name was chosen by producer and writer Tsunku to represent multiple emotions such as joy and sadness multi-lingually, and so the group's CDs would be alphabetically at the start in record stores (although most Hello! Project merchandise is grouped together). The original group itself released only one single.

The group returned from hiatus in 2009 with a new song, "Yes-Yes-Yes", on the Champloo 1: Happy Marriage Song Cover Shū album. It was announced that Reina Tanaka would no longer be a part of the unit, in order to focus on Morning Musume. She was replaced by Hello! Pro Egg Akari Saho, who was only thirteen when she joined. Akari was already a member of two groups, Shugo Chara Egg! and Tomoiki Ki Wo Uetai. The group's new generation's second song, was released later in the same year on the Petit Best 10 collection.

The second generation of Aa! was also featured in the 2010 Shuffle Date tour, performing "First Kiss" and "Yume to Genjitsu". A joint release for Aa! with the shuffle units were announced for June 30, but it never released. Aa! was also featured in the Fankora! tour, performing the songs "First Kiss" and "Masayume".

In 2011, Aa! was featured again in the 2011 Winter tour with the songs "Shining Itoshiki Anata", originally by Country Musume and "DON'T STOP Renaichuu", originally by T&C Bomber.

In April 2011, Akari Saho left Aa! and Hello! Project and joined the group Up Up Girls (Kari).

From February 28 to March 1, Aa! reunited with Miyabi Natsuyaki and Airi Suzuki to perform a slightly updated version of "Masayume" at the Berryz Kobo Matsuri mini-tour, their first activities as Aa! since 2011. On March 3, 2015, Miyabi Natsuyaki graduated from Hello! Project with 5 other members of her main group, Berryz Kobo, as they entered an indefinite hiatus.

On August 20, 2016, it was revealed that Airi Suzuki, the last remaining Aa! member in Hello! Project, will graduate from Hello! Project. She graduated along with all of the members of C-ute on June 12, 2017.

Discography

Singles

Notes and references

External links 
 Official Up-Front Works discography

Japanese girl groups
Japanese idol groups
Hello! Project groups
Japanese pop music groups
Child musical groups
Musical groups from Tokyo
Musical groups established in 2003
2003 establishments in Japan
Japanese musical trios